Toksan Airport is an airport in Tŏksan-dong, Hamhŭng-si, Hamgyong-namdo, North Korea.

Facilities 
The airfield has a single concrete runway 05/23 measuring 8150 x 161 feet (2484 x 49 m).  It is sited in a valley and has a full-length parallel taxiway.  It is home to a fighter-bomber regiment of 24 MiG-21 jets.

References 

Airports in North Korea
Hamhung